Ibrahim Kanté (born July 20, 1981 in Bamako) is a Malian soccer player, a member of the Missouri Comets, a MISL (Major Indoor Soccer League) team.

Career
Kante made two appearances as a rookie in 2003 with New England Revolution of Major League Soccer, before moving on to Milwaukee Wave United of the USL A-League in 2004.

He played several seasons of indoor soccer with Baltimore Blast, the Kansas City Comets and the St. Louis Steamers of the Major Indoor Soccer League before signing with Crystal Palace Baltimore of the USL Second Division in 2007. He scored Baltimore's first ever professional goal, a thunderbolt free kick from the edge of the box in a pre-season friendly.

Kante signed to play with Cleveland City Stars in their inaugural season in the USL First Division on April 20, 2009.

2010–2011 saw him battle through an injury-plagued season with the Omaha Vipers, only starting ten games.  Fully recovered, he signed with the Missouri Comets.

Career statistics
(correct as of 27 September 2008)

References

External links
 Cleveland City stars bio
 Crystal Palace Baltimore bio

1981 births
Living people
American Professional Soccer League players
Baltimore Blast (2001–2008 MISL) players
Crystal Palace Baltimore players
Expatriate soccer players in the United States
Association football defenders
Association football forwards
Association football utility players
Kansas City Comets (2001–2005 MISL) players
Major Indoor Soccer League (2001–2008) players
Major League Soccer players
Malian expatriate footballers
Malian expatriate sportspeople in the United States
Malian footballers
Milwaukee Wave United players
New England Revolution players
Sportspeople from Bamako
St. Louis Steamers (2003–2006 MISL) players
A-League (1995–2004) players
USL First Division players
USL Second Division players
Cleveland City Stars players
Missouri Comets players
Major Indoor Soccer League (2008–2014) players
21st-century Malian people